Bruce Fummey is a Scottish stand-up comedian whose routines are known for their irreverent presentations of traditional Scottish culture, with shows themed around topics such as the Jacobite rising or Burns' "Tam o' Shanter". Previously a physics teacher, and the son of a Ghanaian father and a Scottish mother, Fummey describes himself ironically as "the finest comedian on the Afro-Celtic comedy circuit". He also works as a Tour guide and runs and presents on the YouTube Channel "Scotland History Tours". He lives in Blackford.

In January 2023, he appeared on BBC2's Take a Hike.

References

External links
Fummey's promotional website
A sample  video clip
Review in the Edinburgh Guide.

Year of birth missing (living people)
Living people
Scottish people of Ghanaian descent
Scottish stand-up comedians